Brian Hopper (born 3 January 1943) is an English guitarist and saxophonist.

Hopper was born in Whitstable, Kent, England, and is the older brother of the late bassist Hugh Hopper. With Hugh, he was a member in the early Canterbury scene band Wilde Flowers. He also played saxophone on Soft Machine's album Volume Two and co-wrote several tracks on their eponymous debut.  The death of two bandmates in the early 1970s discouraged Hopper from pursuing a proper career in music, so he went into agricultural crop protection research and development instead.

Only in the latter part of the 1990s, did Hopper re-emerge as an artist of contemporary as well as historical significance.  One of his projects was Canterburied Sounds, a four-CD compilation of archival Canterbury scene recordings from his private collection.

Discography

Filmography
 2015: Romantic Warriors III: Canterbury Tales (DVD)

References

External links
Virtuality in the Voiceprint catalogue
If Ever I Am in the Voiceprint catalogue
Brian Hopper at Calyx, the Canterbury website

1943 births
Living people
People from Whitstable
English jazz guitarists
English rock guitarists
English male guitarists
English jazz saxophonists
English rock saxophonists
British male saxophonists
Canterbury scene
The Wilde Flowers members
21st-century saxophonists
21st-century British male musicians
British male jazz musicians